K-Town is an American reality television series about the lives of a group of young Asian Americans living in Los Angeles' Koreatown. The cast is mostly of Korean descent, with the exception of Scarlet Chan (who is of Chinese descent). The show ran for two seasons.

The series is directed by Eugene Choi, Eddie Kim and Mike Le, produced by Choi, Kim, Le as well as Tyrese Gibson and Jerry Chan, edited by Jerry Chan, with cinematography from Ray Huang, Aaron Torres and Jon Peter.

The series originally cast Jennifer Field and Peter Le, a known webcam personality which was reported by the press initially but was replaced by Jowe Lee and Cammy Chung before the show aired.

Cast
 Cammy Chung (Season 1)
 Christine Chang (Season 2)
 Julian Cheang
 Jasmine Chang
 Joe Cha
 Jowe Lee
 Scarlet Chan
 Steve Kim
 Violet Kim
 Young Lee
 So Young Park

References

External links

2012 American television series debuts
2010s American reality television series
English-language television shows
2013 American television series endings